Rebirth is South Korean boy band SS501's seventh Korean mini-album released on October 20, 2009 by DSP Media.

After SS501 project unit's U R Man and SS501 Solo Collection's album, Rebirth is SS501's first K-Pop album in over one and a half years. It was released in two parts: in a limited and a full edition. The former was released on October 20, while the latter on October 22.

SS501 promoted the album with the single "Love Like This", a track collaborated by Steven Lee, Sean Alexander, and Drew Ryan Scott. The single was also sung by Varsity Fanclub, Scott's group, in English lyrics with the same title single, which was released later in 2010.

Rebirth was the 3rd best-selling album of 2009 in South Korea, after Super Junior's Sorry, Sorry and G-Dragon's Heartbreaker.

Track listing

Music videos
 "Love Like This"

Release history

References

External links

 

SS501 albums
2009 EPs